Anna Bondár (born 27 May 1997) is a Hungarian tennis player. She has career-high WTA rankings of No. 50 in singles, achieved on 18 July 2022, and world No. 47 in doubles, achieved on 24 October 2022. She is the current No. 1 Hungarian WTA player.

Playing for Hungary Fed Cup team, Bondár has a win–loss record of 5–4.

Professional career

2021: WTA 125 title, top 100 debut
The 2021 season was one of progress for Bondár. In July, at the Poland Open in Gdynia, she reached her first WTA Tour-level quarterfinal also recording her first two wins on the WTA Tour.

Starting early September, she had a series of good results. The first step was the $60K Collonge-Bellerive tournament where she reached semifinal after defeating all her opponents in straight-sets. The following week, she advanced to quarterfinal of the Karlsruhe Open, a tournament that is part of WTA Challenger Tour. Two weeks later, she won her first significant ITF title at the $80K Wiesbaden in both singles and doubles events. Her journey continued seven days later when she reached another $80K final in Le Neuborg. This time she failed to lift the trophy, losing to Mihaela Buzărnescu.

In early November, she won her first title at a WTA 125 event, defeating Diane Parry in the final of the Argentina Open. The following week, she won the $60K Santiago and secured her debut in the top 100 at world No. 90 on 15 November 2021.

2022: Major, WTA 1000 & top 50 debut, Major quarterfinal & title in doubles 
She made her Grand Slam debut at the Australian Open in singles and doubles.

At the French Open, she reached her first Grand Slam quarterfinal in her career in the doubles event partnering Greet Minnen.

Seeded ninth at the Budapest Grand Prix she reached the semifinals without dropping a set defeating second seed Martina Trevisan. As a result, she reached the top 50 on 18 July 2022.

She won her maiden WTA title in doubles at the 2022 Internazionali Femminili di Palermo partnering with Kimberley Zimmermann.

Performance timelines

Only main-draw results in WTA Tour, Grand Slam tournaments, Fed Cup/Billie Jean King Cup and Olympic Games are included in win–loss records.

Singles
Current after the 2023 Indian Wells Open.

Doubles
Current after the 2023 BNP Paribas Open.

WTA career finals

Doubles: 1 (1 title)

WTA Challenger finals

Singles: 1 (title)

Doubles: 1 (title)

ITF Circuit finals

Singles: 21 (12 titles, 9 runner–ups)

Doubles: 34 (21 titles, 13 runner–ups)

ITF Junior Circuit finals

Singles: 5 (2 titles, 3 runner–ups)

Doubles: 11 (6 titles, 5 runner–ups)

Fed Cup/Billie Jean King Cup 
Bondár made her Billie Jean King Cup debut for Hungary in 2015, while the team was competing in the Europe/Africa Zone Group I, when she was 17 years and 255 days old.

Singles: 10 (5–5)

Doubles: 4 (4–0)

Best Grand Slam results details

Singles

Doubles

Record against top 10 players
Bondár's record against players who have been ranked in the top 10. Active players are in boldface:

Notes

References

External links
 
 
 

1997 births
Living people
People from Szeghalom
Hungarian female tennis players
Tennis players at the 2014 Summer Youth Olympics
Sportspeople from Békés County
21st-century Hungarian women